The Martinique amazon (Amazona martinicana) is a hypothetical extinct species of Caribbean parrot in the family Psittacidae. It is not known from any material remains, but was said to be similar to the red-necked amazon (A. arausiaca) from Dominica, the next major island to the north of Martinique. Natives are known to have traded extensively in parrots between the Antilles, and it seems that the Martinique population was in some way related to or even descended from A. arausiaca.

Jean-Baptiste Labat described them as follows in 1742:

Assuming it was a genuine and distinct taxon, it was endemic to Martinique and became extinct due to habitat loss as Martinique was cleared for agriculture. It has not been recorded since 1722.

The Guadeloupe amazon ("A. violacea"), a similarly speculative "species", was said to inhabit the island of Guadeloupe. It is sometimes considered to be the same as  "A. martinicana". However, it is more widely held to be related or identical to the imperial amazon (A. imperialis), the second Amazona species of Dominica.

References

Amazon parrots
Bird extinctions since 1500
Birds described in 1905
Taxa named by Austin Hobart Clark
Martinican culture
Extinct birds of the Caribbean
Species made extinct by human activities
Taxonomy articles created by Polbot
Hypothetical extinct species 
Controversial parrot taxa